Pilocrocis evanidalis is a moth in the family Crambidae. It was described by Schaus in 1920. It is found in Guatemala.

The wingspan is about 30 mm. The wings are silky brown, faintly cupreous. The forewings have a faint, darker, antemedial line, and there is a small dark and narrow linear spot on the discocellular area. The postmedial line is fine and slightly darker. The hindwings have very faint traces of a postmedial line.

References

Pilocrocis
Moths described in 1920
Moths of Central America